Victor Scheffers (born 22 May 1960) is a retired Dutch rower.

Career
Scheffers competed at the 1980 Summer Olympics in the quadruple sculls and finished in eighth place. In 1978 he won a bronze medal at the junior world championships in the double scull event.

References

1960 births
Living people
Dutch male rowers
Olympic rowers of the Netherlands
Rowers at the 1980 Summer Olympics
People from Lansingerland
Sportspeople from South Holland
20th-century Dutch people